Melike is a Turkish female given name, and it means queen.

People named Melike include the following:
 Melike Bakırcıoğlu, Turkish basketball player
 Melike Günal (born 1998), Turkish weightlifter
 Melike Mama Hatun, female ruler of the Saltuklu dynasty
 Melike Öztürk (born 2001), Turkish footballer
 Melike Pekel (born 1995), Turkish-German footballer
 Melike Tarhan, Turkish music artist

References

Turkish feminine given names